Neerpelt (literally Lower Pelt) is a town in Pelt and a former municipality located in the Belgian province of Limburg. In 2018, the municipality had a total population of 17,174. The total area is 42.78 km².

Effective 1 January 2019, Neerpelt and Overpelt were merged into the new municipality of Pelt.

Culture
Provinciaal Domein Dommelhof is the cultural center of Neerpelt. This institute houses several smaller organisations:
 Musica: Impulse Center for music, and manager of het Klankenbos (the sound forest) on the Dommelhof site
 Zebracinema: arthouse cinema in Belgian Limburg
 Circus Center: Flemish anchor point for circus art
 Jazzcase: Northern Limburg jazz platform

The Klankenbos is the biggest sound art collection in public space in Europe. In the forest there are 15 sound installation pieces by artists such as Pierre Berthet, Paul Panhuysen, Geert Jan Hobbijn (Staalplaat Soundsystem), Hans van Koolwijk, and others.

Famous inhabitants
Famous people who were born or lived in Neerpelt include:
 Stijn Coninx, director of Academy Award nominated film "Daens"
 Ken De Dycker, motocross racer
 Eric Geboers, motocross world champion
 Bart Goor, football (soccer) player, played 65 times for the Belgium national team 
 Wim Mertens, composer, musician, and musicologist (b. 1953)
 , singer-songwriter with the bands Monza and Noordkaap
 Belle Perez, singer
 Raf Simons, fashion designer
 Jelle Vanendert, professional cyclist who currently rides for Lotto-Belisol
 Joost Zweegers, singer-songwriter with the band Novastar
 Hans Vanaken, football player

See also
Sint-Hubertuscollege

References

External links
 
 

Pelt
Former municipalities of Limburg (Belgium)
Populated places in Limburg (Belgium)